Pierre C. Hohenberg (3 October 1934 – 15 December 2017) was a French-American theoretical physicist, who worked primarily on statistical mechanics. Hohenberg studied at Harvard, where he earned his bachelor's degree in 1956 and a master's degree in 1958 (after a stay during 1956/57 at École Normale Supérieure), and his doctorate in 1962.
From 1962 to 1963, he was at the Institute for Physical Problems in Moscow, followed by a stay at the École Normale Supérieure in Paris.
From 1964 to 1995 he was at Bell Laboratories in Murray Hill.
From 1985 to 1989, he was director of the department of theoretical physics and from 1989 to 1995 was "Distinguished Member of Technical Staff".
From 1974 to 1977, he was also professor of theoretical physics at the TU München, where he had previously been a 1972–1973 guest professor.
From 1995 to 2003 he was "Deputy Provost of Science and Technology" at Yale University.
Subsequently, he was the Yale "Eugene Higgins Adjunct Professor of Physics and Applied Physics".
Hohenberg was additionally from 1963 to 1964 and again in 1988 guest professor in Paris and in 1990–1991 a Lorentz-Professor in Leiden.
In 2004 he became Senior Vice Provost of Research at New York University, a position held until 2011, when he stepped down to join the Physics Department as Professor.
In 2012 he became Emeritus Professor of Physics at NYU.

Hohenberg was also politically active.
In 1983, he chaired the committee of the APS for the freedom of scientists and in 1992–1993 on an APS committee for the support of scientists in the former Soviet Union. From 1984 to 1996, he was a member of the committee for human rights of the New York Academy of Sciences. Hohenberg was a member of the American Academy of Arts and Sciences (since 1985), the National Academy of Sciences (from 1989), the American Philosophical Society (since 2014) and the New York Institute for the Humanities (since 2016).
He received in 1990 the Fritz London Memorial Prize, in 1999 the Max Planck Medal, and in 2003 the Lars Onsager Prize of the APS.

Hohenberg formulated in 1964 with Walter Kohn the Hohenberg–Kohn theorem in the course of his work on density functional theory.
He became famous primarily for his investigations in the 1960s and 1970s in the theory of dynamic (i.e. temporally variable) critical phenomena close to phase transitions.
He collaborated thereby with Bertrand Halperin, Shang-keng Ma and Eric Siggia in the application of renormalization methods.
Additionally, Hohenberg worked (with Swift) on hydrodynamic instabilities and on pattern formation in non-equilibrium systems with Michael Cross.
Preceding David Mermin and Herbert Wagner he proved in 1967 the impossibility of spontaneous symmetry breaking in one and two dimensions.
In collaboration with Richard Friedberg, he presented a new formulation of nonrelativistic quantum mechanics based on the consistent histories approach to the interpretation of quantum mechanics.

An accomplished continuous distance swimmer, Hohenberg in the second decade of the 21st century annually contested the artist/writer Richard Kostelanetz in a one-hour race at the NYU Coles pool until the pool was closed.
Usually they declare a draw.

See also
Critical phenomena
Dynamic scaling

Selected works
 P. Hohenberg and W. Kohn: Inhomogeneous Electron Gas. Phys. Rev. 136 (1964) B864–B871.
 B. I. Halperin and P. C. Hohenberg: Generalization of scaling laws to dynamical properties of a system near its critical point, Physical Review Letters 19, 1967, p. 700, .
 B. I. Halperin and P. C. Hohenberg: Scaling laws for dynamical critical phenomena, Physical Review Vol. 177, 1969, p. 952, .
 B. I. Halperin, P. C. Hohenberg, Shang-keng Ma: Calculation of dynamical critical properties using Wilson's expansion methods, Physical Review Letters Vol. 29, 1972, p. 1548, .
 J. Swift, P. C. Hohenberg: Hydrodynamic Fluctuations at the convective instability, Physical Review, A, Vol. 15, 1977, p. 319, .
 P. C. Hohenberg: Existence of long range order in one and two dimensions, Physical Review Vol. 158, 1967, p. 383, .
 P. C. Hohenberg: Dynamical theory of critical phenomena, in E. G. D. Cohen (Ed.) "Statistical mechanics at the turn of the decade", Dekker, New York 1971.
 P. C. Hohenberg, B. I. Halperin: Theory of dynamical critical phenomena, Reviews of Modern Physics, Vol. 49, 1977, pp. 435–479, .
 M. C. Cross, P. C. Hohenberg: Pattern formation out of equilibrium, Reviews of Modern Physics, Vol. 65, 1993, pp. 851–1112, .
 R. Friedberg, P. C. Hohenberg: Compatible Quantum Theory, Rep. Prog. Phys. 77, 2014,  pp 092001–092035, .

References

External links
 Homepage at NYU

1934 births
2017 deaths
American physicists
French physicists
Harvard University alumni
Academic staff of the Technical University of Munich
Members of the United States National Academy of Sciences
Fellows of the American Academy of Arts and Sciences
Members of the American Philosophical Society
Fellows of the American Physical Society
Winners of the Max Planck Medal
New York University faculty